Christian Sauvé (12 July 1943 – 11 January 2023) was a French painter and professor.

Biography
Born in Déville-lès-Rouen on 12 July 1943, Sauvé began painting at the age of 12. During this time, he met Marie-Ange Rialland, who he would later marry, and designed murals at a school in Le Havre designed by the architect Bernard Zehrfuss.

After staying in Italy, Belgium, the Netherlands, and England, Sauvé received the Grand Prix de la Casa de Velázquez in 1969 and began a stay in Madrid. From 1970 to 1971, he stayed in Portugal, Senegal, Mauritania, and Morocco. From 1971 to 2008, he worked as a professor at the École des beaux-arts de Rouen. In 1972, he moved to Mortemer, Seine-Maritime before settling in Sainte-Beuve-en-Rivière for good in 1974. On his painting style, he commented "Painting requires slowness, concentration. You have to give it time to receive it and be able to meditate on it. An artist is like a volcano. He expresses in himself a whole world. The act of painting is like a vital breath, a universal experience. It is a constant quest for light".

Sauvé died in Sainte-Beuve-en-Rivière on 11 January 2023, at the age of 79.

References

1943 births
2023 deaths
20th-century French painters
21st-century French painters
People from Déville-lès-Rouen